Louis Anthony McEvoy (May 30, 1902 – December 17, 1953) was a Major League Baseball pitcher. In 34 career games, he had a 1–3 record, with a 7.79 ERA. He batted and threw right-handed.

McEvoy was born in Williamsburg, Kansas and died in Webster Groves, Missouri.

External links 

1902 births
1953 deaths
People from Franklin County, Kansas
New York Yankees players
Major League Baseball pitchers
Baseball players from Kansas
Chattanooga Lookouts players
Albany Senators players
Oakland Oaks (baseball) players
Hollywood Stars players
St. Paul Saints (AA) players
Birmingham Barons players
San Francisco Seals (baseball) players